Pedroso de Acim is a municipality located in the province of Cáceres, Extremadura, Spain.

References 

Municipalities in the Province of Cáceres